Events of 2021 in Fiji.

Incumbents

Government of Fiji 
President: George Konrote
Prime Minister: Frank Bainimarama
 Speaker: Epeli Nailatikau

Cabinet of Fiji

Events
Ongoing – COVID-19 pandemic in Fiji

15 January – Nazahat Shameen Khan of Fiji wins the presidency of the United Nations Human Rights Council (UNHRC).
4 February – Pal Ahluwalia, Vice-Chancellor of the University of the South Pacific and his wife are deported to Australia.
24 February – Activists and non-governmental organizations report an increase in violence against women and girls since the COVID-19 pandemic and its associated lockdowns and curfews began a year ago. 64% of women in Fiji say they have been victims of some type of abuse.
10 April – The opening of Hanifa Mosque.

Predicted and scheduled events 

7 September – Constitution Day
11 October – Fiji Day
18 October – Mawlid (Birthday of Muhammad)
4 November – Diwali (Hindu, Jain, Sikh ″Festival of Lights)
25 December – Christmas

Deaths
March 10 – Joketani Cokanasiga, 84, politician.

See also 

2021–22 South Pacific cyclone season
2021 Pacific typhoon season
2020 in Oceania

References 

 
2021 in Oceania